The seventh season of Swedish Idol premiered on September 7, 2010 and concluded in December 2010 and was broadcast by TV4. Judges Anders Bagge, Laila Bagge Wahlgren and Andreas Carlsson continued to judge the show's contestants for their third year, along with, for the fourth consecutive year, Peter Jihde as host.

Changes from Season 6
The ten finals will be held on Fridays, 5 of them in a studio in Stockholm and the other five one each at Göteborg, Karlstad, Malmö and Luleå. The finals will be again at the Globe Arena in Stockholm. It is only the second year that the show is on tour in various cities, and this year, the tour is more extended than last year and it will be the fewest shows from studio in the capital Stockholm.
The official trailer was released in mid-August and the theme for it is "Aiming for the stars". The video features the three judges entering a spaceship and heading for the stars, searching for the next Swedish Idol. Former contestants, Agnes and Amanda Jensen is also featured in the video.

Regional auditions phase
The large number of applicants to the Idol in both Göteborg and Stockholm prompted the organizers to extend auditions by one day. According to TV4, it was also a record number who sought to Idol in the other urban areas. So far, around 11,700 people applied for Idol in 2010, which is a record for Swedish Idol.

Elimination Chart

On October 15 Minnah Karlsson and Alice Hagenbrant were the bottom two with Minnah being eliminated. However, since Alice withdrew shortly after Minnah was allowed to return.

Idol 2010 albums

Det bästa från Idol 2010 (The Best from Idol 2010) is a sampling Swedish Idol 2010 shows. In addition, at the beginning of the 10th series, an initial album was released containing performances during auditions to this year's series.

References

External links
Official TV4 site for Idol 2010
Jay Smith Official
Minnah Karlsson Official 
Olle Hedberg Official
Linnea Henriksson Official
Geir Rönning Official

2010 Swedish television seasons
Season 07
2010 in Swedish music